The Translated songs (Honyaku shōka, meaning "translated songs") in the narrow sense are the foreign-language songs that were translated into Japanese, when Western-style songs were introduced into school education in the Meiji era (the latter half of the 19th century) of Japan. They were distinguished from the songs which appeared in the music textbooks of the Ministry of Education that were made by the Japanese. Translated songs in a broader sense means any foreign language songs that have been translated into Japanese.

Translated songs by language 
Here are typical translated songs in both narrow and broader senses:
Chinese
Zai Na Yaoyuan De Difang
Mo Li Hua

English 
Home! Sweet Home!
Comin' Thro' the Rye

French
Sur le pont d'Avignon
Plaisir d'amour

German
Am Brunnen vor dem Tore
Wenn ich ein Vöglein wär

Korean
Arirang
Doraji

Russian
Po dikim stepyam Zabaikalya
The Song of the Volga Boatmen

See also  
Music of Japan
Monbushō shōka (文部省唱歌)
Primary School Songbooks (Japanese) (小学唱歌集), edited by Isawa Shūji and published in 1879–84.

References

External link
明治期の唱歌教育における翻訳唱歌と国民形成（佐藤慶治） (in Japanese)

Japanese music
Meiji period